Davide Longo (born 9 December 1975) is an English former professional rugby league footballer who started playing Rugby League for Stanley Rangers ARLFC, playing in the 1980s, 1990s and 2000s, and as of 2019 he was the Chief Executive Officer of Featherstone Rovers. Davide Longo left Featherstone Rovers in March 2021 to take on a new role with Bradford City AFC as Chief Commercial Officer

Background
Davide Longo was born in Wakefield, West Yorkshire, England. HIs father was born in Alessandria Della Rocca, Agrigento. Sicily allowing him dual nationality status.

International honours
Davide Longo represented Great Britain (Academy) against France (Academy) playing in two international matches at Hilton Park, Leigh and Carcasonne, Southern France.

Super League
Davide Longo signed for Bradford Bulls on 15th December 1995 and made his debut on Wednesday 20th December 1995 against Warrington at Wilderspool Stadium. Davide Longo made his Super League debut for Bradford Bulls on 8 April 1996 against London Broncos at Odsal Stadium.

Challenge Cup
Davide Longo was part of the Bradford Bulls 1996 Challenge Cup Final squad. He scored a hat-trick of tries against Batley on 4 February 1996 and featured in every round in games against Leigh Centurions, Wakefield Trinity and Leeds.

References

External links

Wasps' Ram raid
Wasps' Ram raid

Hull KR hit by injuries
Wakefield receive police funding
Hull KR hit by injuries
Dewsbury Hang On To Win Rochdale Thriller
2001 Challenge Cup Round 3
Swinton Lions 1998 Season Fixtures
Rams keep fighting spirit alive
xManning Stainton on the ball in Wakefield
2002 Challenge Cup Round 4
Youngsters flock to Wakefield at Easter
Wildcats take on soap stars in charity match
Wildcats  2009
Davide Longo
Wildcats' show commitment to learning
Spoon 'Play for Success' at Super League Game

1975 births
Living people
Batley Bulldogs players
Bradford Bulls players
Dewsbury Rams players
English rugby league players
English people of Sicilian descent
Keighley Cougars players
Rugby league centres
Rugby league five-eighths
Rugby league fullbacks
Rugby league players from Wakefield
Swinton Lions players